A Pest in the House is a Merrie Melodies animated short film released on August 2, 1947. It is directed by Chuck Jones and stars the characters of Daffy Duck and Elmer Fudd.

The film features a transitional interpretation of Daffy. He is not necessarily the zany, impish interpretation used by Tex Avery and Bob Clampett, nor is he the greedy, self-centered version that Chuck Jones later popularized in the 1950s. As Paul Dini said in the DVD audio commentary for this cartoon: "[In this cartoon, Daffy] is really kind of almost like a sprite. He's just a little, almost elfin creature who's not really out to hurt anybody or has any ill will or malice toward anybody. He's just absolutely out of his mind unhinged."

It was only one of three non-Bugs Bunny cartoons from 1947 not to be reissued. The others were Mexican Joyride and Catch as Cats Can (which is the only one of the three that Daffy doesn't appear in).

The cartoon was followed up in 1948 by Daffy Duck Slept Here, wherein Daffy (this time as a fellow guest) again does not let a hotel patron sleep – in this case Porky Pig.

Plot
The cartoon starts with a brief narration describing a labor shortage that "became so bad" that employers are willing to hire "anybody – or anything". At the "Gland Hotel", Daffy is a hotel bellboy and Elmer Fudd is the manager. Elmer tells Daffy to take a customer to room 666. The customer (voiced by Arthur Q. Bryan, in his natural voice) asks for peace and quiet, and suddenly threatens to punch Elmer right in the nose if he is disturbed at any time.
 
Daffy, in a Jerry Colonna-like sarcastic aside to the audience, remarks: "Likable chap, isn't he?", intending to take advantage of this condition to cause pain to his employer. Daffy does many stunts that keep the man awake, complete with escorting him to room 666. Every time he is awakened again, the increasingly irritated man trudges to the lobby, to the tune of "Pop Goes the Weasel", and at the second where the song says "pop", he punches Elmer in the face (Elmer at one point gets hit through the phone and later dons a knight's helmet in a futile attempt to prevent getting hit).

After several shenanigans (including barging in to tell him the legendary "traveling salesman story", only to forget the punch line), Daffy finally concludes it is too cold in the man's room and decides to fix the radiator. Elmer, knowing he will get beat up again, chases after Daffy. Daffy makes the heat vibrate to the room. Elmer hears whistling and covers it with several pillows. Daffy, thinking that Elmer is blowing whistles, proceeds to rant loudly to him: "So, a fine kettle of fish! Here I work myself down to the skin and bones trying to keep this guy asleep, and what do you do? Blow whistles! Just when I got things so quiet, you can hear a pin drop, you bust in here and bust out with a whistle, and you snafu the whole works! How in the name of all that's reasonable do you expect a guy to get his slumber when a goof like you goes around making noises like a one-man Fourth of July celebration?! He needs peace, and quiet! It's positively outrageous!" His screaming obviously wakes the now infuriated man, so Elmer hurries downstairs and he and Daffy switch places through a promotion in an effort to fool the man: "Fow vewy mewitowious sewvice, you are hewewith pwomoted to the position of managew. Take ovew." However, Elmer gets punched one last time, and Daffy concludes the cartoon with another Jerry Colonna-like aside: "Noisy little character, isn't he?"

Reception
Director David Bowers writes, "A Pest in the House is a great cartoon featuring a terrific performance from Daffy Duck. Although it's directed by Chuck Jones, he hadn't yet developed Daffy into the selfish, greedy, ill-tempered foil to Bugs Bunny that he would become. For me, the cartoon is the best of two worlds: the wonderful drawings, poses, and comic timing of Jones' direction coupled with the much funnier Daffy of directors Bob Clampett and Frank Tashlin... Daffy was rarely more obnoxious — or funnier."

Cast
 Mel Blanc as Daffy Duck, Unseen Drunk and Narrator
 Arthur Q. Bryan as Elmer Fudd and Hotel Guest (uncredited)

See also
Looney Tunes and Merrie Melodies filmography (1940–1949)

References

External links

1947 animated films
1947 short films
1947 films
1940s Warner Bros. animated short films
1940s English-language films
Short films directed by Chuck Jones
Daffy Duck films
Elmer Fudd films
Films set in hotels
Merrie Melodies short films
Films scored by Carl Stalling
Films with screenplays by Michael Maltese